Manufactum GmbH & Co. KG (formerly Manufactum Hoof & Partner KG) is a German retailer with nine full-sized stores in Germany and an online store that serves primarily Germany, Austria, Switzerland, and the UK. The main focus of the company are household and garden goods made with traditional manufacturing methods (thus "Manufactum") and materials. The company also sells cosmetics, apparel and shoes, computers, bikes, foodstuffs, books, bed and bath accessories, and furniture.

History

Manufactum was founded in 1988 by Thomas Hoof, former managing director of the German Green Party in North Rhine-Westphalia. In 2008, Heine Versand, a wholly owned subsidiary of Otto GmbH, took over Manufactum. In 2007, Manufactum had 400 employees and annual sales of 75 million EUR.

Stores are currently located in Hamburg, Bremen, Berlin, Waltrop, Düsseldorf, Cologne, Bonn, Frankfurt, Stuttgart, Vienna, and Munich.

In Germany, Manufactum catalogs have been enjoying almost cult-like status among a certain clientele. Product descriptions are in-depth, sometimes ironic, and in very good German, for which Manufactum received the 2003 German language award by the Verein Deutsche Sprache, a language preservation society. On the other hand, there is criticism that the typical high-priced Manufactum products are quite elitist and that Manufactum does not like to disclose it is benefiting from globalization because some of its products are made in Asia.

The brands "Manufactum brot&butter" (groceries; own stores in several German cities) and "Gutes aus Klöstern" (monastic products), the restaurant "Gasthaus Lohnhalle", and the designer furniture brand "Magazin" (with stores in Stuttgart, Bonn, and Munich) also belong to the Manufactum group.

In its monthly newsletter, Manufactum has expressed criticism of the EU decision to phase out incandescent light bulbs in favor of compact fluorescent lamps, pointing out that the latter contain mercury and taking the stance that such a ban represents an undue infringement of consumer rights.

Since the sale of Manufactum group to Otto GmbH, Manufactum founder Thomas Hoof has been concentrating on his work at Thomas Hoof Produktgesellschaft mbH & Co. KG (which offers wholesale products to Manufactum among others) and his publishing house Manuscriptum Verlagsbuchhandlung Thomas Hoof KG.

References

External links
Manufactum (international web site)
Manufactum UK
Manufactum Germany 

Retail companies established in 1988
Online retailers of Germany
Mail-order retailers
Retail companies of Germany